Ellesmere Urban is a civil parish in Shropshire, England.  It contains 106 listed buildings that are recorded in the National Heritage List for England.  Of these, one is listed at Grade I, the highest of the three grades, two are at Grade II*, the middle grade, and the others are at Grade II, the lowest grade.  Ellesmere is a market town, and most of the listed buildings are houses, cottages, and shops in the town.  Some of them date from the 17th  century and are timber framed, but the largest number date from the early 19th century, some of which incorporate earlier material.  The oldest listed building is the parish church, and a sundial in the churchyard is also listed.  The other listed buildings include public houses and a hotel, a canal warehouse, a bank, a mounting block, a town hall, a former fire station, and a former railway station.

Key

Buildings

References

Citations

Sources

Lists of buildings and structures in Shropshire
Listed